János Kalmár (born 16 April 1942) is a Hungarian fencer. He won a bronze medal in the team sabre event at the 1968 Summer Olympics.

References

External links
 

1942 births
Living people
Hungarian male sabre fencers
Olympic fencers of Hungary
Fencers at the 1968 Summer Olympics
Olympic bronze medalists for Hungary
Olympic medalists in fencing
Martial artists from Budapest
Medalists at the 1968 Summer Olympics